Senator Thomas may refer to:

Members of the United States Senate
Charles S. Thomas (1849–1934), U.S. Senator from Colorado from 1913 to 1921
Craig L. Thomas (1933–2007), U.S. Senator from Wyoming from 1995 to 2007
Elbert D. Thomas (1883–1953), U.S. Senator from Utah from 1933 until 1951
Elmer Thomas (1876–1965), U.S. Senator from Oklahoma from 1927 to 1951
Jesse B. Thomas (1777–1853), U.S Senator from Illinois from 1818 to 1829
John W. Thomas (1874–1945), U.S. Senator from Idaho from 1928 to 1933 and from 1940 to 1945

United States state senate members
Buzz Thomas (born 1969), Michigan State Senate
Cecil Thomas (politician) (born 1952), Ohio State Senate
Charles Thomas (Delaware governor) (1790–1848), Delaware State Senate
Christopher Thomas (1818–1879), Virginia State Senate
David L. Thomas (born 1949), South Carolina State Senate
Dorsey B. Thomas (1823–1897), Tennessee State Senate
Douglas Thomas (politician) (fl. 2010s), Maine State Senate
Edward B. Thomas (1848–1929), New York State Senate
Fred Thomas (Montana politician) (born 1958), Montana State Senate
Henry F. Thomas (1843–1912), Michigan State Senate
James Thomas (Governor of Maryland) (1785–1845), Maryland State Senate
Joe Thomas (Alaska politician) (born 1948), Alaska State Senate
John E. Thomas (politician) (1829–1910), Wisconsin State Senate
Kevin Thomas (politician) (fl. 2010s), New York State Senate
Lowell Thomas Jr. (1923–2016), Alaska State Senate
Nadine Thomas (born 1952), Georgia State Senate
Ormsby B. Thomas (1832–1904), Wisconsin State Senate
Pat Thomas (politician) (1933–2000), Florida State Senate
Ralph W. Thomas (1862–1920), New York State Senate
Reggie Thomas (born 1953), Kentucky State Senate
Regina Thomas (fl. 1990s–2000s), Georgia State Senate
Richard Thomas (Pennsylvania politician) (1744–1832), Pennsylvania State Senate
Scott Thomas (district attorney) (born 1966), North Carolina State Senate
William Holland Thomas (1805–1893), North Carolina State Senate
William Reuben Thomas (1866–1943), Florida State Senate
William W. Thomas Jr. (1839–1927), Maine State Senate